Sarke is a Norwegian metal band from Oslo, formed in 2008. The band has released seven studio albums and is currently signed to Norwegian record label Indie Recordings.

History 
Sarke formed in 2008 when Thomas "Sarke" Bergli (Khold, Tulus) decided to make a solo album. In November 2008, Sarke recorded the tracks for the album with keyboardist Anders Hunstad, produced by Lars-Erik Westby. Ted "Nocturno Culto" Skjellum (Darkthrone, ex-Satyricon) joined Sarke and provided vocals for the debut album, titled Vorunah, released on 6 April 2009 via Indie Recordings. In 2009, drummer Asgeir Mickelson and guitarist Terje "Cyrus" Andersen joined the band as live members. In 2010, Steinar Gundersen joined Sarke as their second guitar player. In 2009 and 2010, the band played at several festivals such as Wacken Open Air (with the guest appearance of Thomas Gabriel Fischer), Inferno Festival, Hole in the Sky, Party.San Open Air, Brutal Assault and Ragnarök Festival. After the festivals, Mickelson, Cyrus and Gundersen became full-time members of the band.

On 15 April 2011, Sarke released a new album, Oldarhian, via Indie Recordings.

On 20 September 2013, the band released their third studio album, titled Aruagint, via Indie Recordings.

Musical style and influences 
Sarke's sound can be described as a blend of black metal and thrash metal, that incorporates doom metal, death metal and punk elements. According to the band, they are influenced by '70s rock, '80s speed metal and '90s black metal. They are inspired by bands like Mayhem, Slayer, Darkthrone, Celtic Frost, Black Sabbath, Candlemass, Death, Motörhead and Kreator.

Members 
Current members
 Sarke – drums, guitar (2008–2011); bass (2008–present)
 Nocturno Culto – lead vocals (2008–present)
 Anders Hunstad – keyboards (2008–present)
 Terje Kråbøl – drums (2011–present)
 Steinar Gundersen – guitar (2011–present)

Former members
 Cyrus – guitar (2011–2013)

Session members
 Asgeir Mickelson – drums (2009–2011)
 Cyrus – guitar (2009–2011)
 Steinar Gundersen – guitar (2010–2011)

Discography 
 Vorunah (2009)
 Oldarhian (2011)
 Aruagint (2013)
 Bogefod (2016)
 Viige Urh (2017)
 Gastwerso (2019)
 Allsighr (2021)

References

External links 
 Official Facebook page

Norwegian black metal musical groups
Norwegian thrash metal musical groups
Musical groups established in 2008
Musical groups from Oslo